A bronze statue of Captain James Cook by Thomas Brock is located near Admiralty Arch on the south side of The Mall in London, United Kingdom. The statue was completed in 1914 and is maintained by The Royal Parks. It is mounted on a stone plinth.

The idea for the memorial was first proposed by Joseph Carruthers, the former prime minister of New South Wales, who had written to The Times complaining of the lack of a statue to Captain Cook in London. The completed work was unveiled on 7 July 1914 by Prince Arthur, Duke of Connaught and Strathearn.

See also
 List of public art in St James's

References

External links
 

1914 establishments in England
1914 sculptures
Bronze sculptures in the United Kingdom
Buildings and structures on The Mall, London
Cook, James
Monuments and memorials to James Cook
Sculptures by Thomas Brock
Cook, James
Statues in London